Harald Fleischer (born 22 January 1985) is a German former professional footballer who played as a midfielder.

Career
Fleischer made his professional debut in the 3. Liga for Jahn Regensburg on 13 December 2008, coming on as a substitute in the 87th minute for Manuel Hiemer in the 3–0 away win against Eintracht Braunschweig.

References

External links
 
 

1985 births
Living people
People from Făgăraș
German people of German-Romanian descent
German footballers
Association football midfielders
SpVgg Greuther Fürth II players
SSV Jahn Regensburg players
SpVgg Bayern Hof players
3. Liga players
Regionalliga players